The 2022 Arkansas lieutenant gubernatorial election was held on November 8, 2022, to elect the lieutenant governor of the state of Arkansas. The election coincided with various other federal and state elections, including for Governor of Arkansas. Primary elections were held on May 24. Arkansas is one of 21 states that elects its lieutenant governor separately from its governor.

Incumbent Republican lieutenant governor Tim Griffin was barred by the Constitution of Arkansas from running for a third term; he instead ran successfully for Attorney General. Griffin was re-elected in 2018 with 64.2% of the vote.

Republican Attorney General Leslie Rutledge won the election, handily defeating her Democratic opponent Kelly Krout. She became the first woman elected lieutenant governor of Arkansas, coinciding with the election of Sarah Huckabee Sanders as the first woman elected governor of Arkansas.

Republican primary

Candidates

Nominee 
Leslie Rutledge, Arkansas Attorney General

Eliminated in primary 
Chris Bequette, lawyer and financial adviser
Greg Bledsoe, Arkansas Surgeon General
Jason Rapert, state senator
Doyle Webb, former chair of the Republican Party of Arkansas and former state senator
Joseph Wood, Washington County judge

Endorsements

Polling

Results

Democratic primary

Candidates

Nominee 
Kelly Krout, graduate student and candidate for Arkansas House of Representatives in 2020

Withdrew 
Drew Pritt, small business owner (running for state house)

Endorsements

Libertarian primary

Candidates

Nominee 
Frank Gilbert, former Mayor of Tull and perennial candidate

General election

Endorsements

Results

See also 
2022 Arkansas elections

Notes

References

External links 
Official campaign sites
Frank Gilbert (L) for Lieutenant Governor
Kelly Krout (D) for Lieutenant Governor
Leslie Rutledge (R) for Lieutenant Governor

Lieutenant Governor
Arkansas
Arkansas lieutenant gubernatorial elections